The Chang Yu-sheng Memorial Museum is a museum about singer Chang Yu-sheng in Magong City, Penghu County, Taiwan.

Exhibitions
The museum exhibits Chang's various works and legacy.

See also
 List of museums in Taiwan

References

Museums in Penghu County